Vladimir Cojocaru is a Moldovan professional footballer who plays as a defender for  Spartanii Selemet.
He played eight matches for FC Petrocub in the Moldovan National Division during the 2015–16 and 2016–17 seasons.

References

External links 
 

1988 births
Living people
People from Hîncești District
Moldovan footballers
Association football defenders
Moldovan Super Liga players
CS Petrocub Hîncești players